Steady as She Goes is the Voodoo Glow Skulls' sixth full-length album. It was released on July 2, 2002, on Victory Records.

Track listing

References 

Voodoo Glow Skulls albums
2002 albums
Victory Records albums